Tetramorium simillimum, is a species of ant in the subfamily Myrmicinae. It is a small pale colored widespread species that can be found in almost all the continents.

References

External links

 at antwiki.org
Animaldiversity.org
Itis.org
Evergreen.edu

simillimum
Hymenoptera of Asia
Insects described in 1851